The Chicago Catchers were an American professional Twenty20 franchise cricket team that competed in Minor League Cricket (MiLC). The team was based in Chicago, Illinois. It was formed in 2020 as part of 24 original teams to compete in Minor League Cricket. The franchise was owned by the Cricket Management Group, LLC.

The team's home ground was Washington Park, located in Chicago, Illinois. Former Canadian cricket captain Rizwan Cheema helmed captaincy duties, while Karan Kumar stood by as vice-captain.

Americans Shreyas Ramesh and Ranadeep Aleti led the bowling and batting leaderboards with 266 runs and 10 wickets respectively.

Franchise history

Background 
Talks of an American Twenty20 league started in November 2018 before USA Cricket became the new governing body of cricket in the United States. In May 2021, USA Cricket announced they accepted a bid by American Cricket Enterprises (ACE) for a US$1 billion investment covering the league and other investments benefitting the U.S. national teams.

In an Annual General Meeting (AGM) on February 21, 2020, it was announced that USA Cricket planned to launch Major League Cricket in 2021 and Minor League Cricket that summer, but it was delayed due to the COVID-19 pandemic and due to the lack of high-quality cricket stadiums in the U.S. Major League Cricket was pushed to a summer-2023 launch and Minor League Cricket was pushed back to July 31, 2021.

USA Cricket CEO Iain Higgins also pointed out cities such as New York City, Houston and Los Angeles with a large cricket fanbase, and targeted them among others as launch cities for Minor League Cricket.

Exhibition league 
In July 2020, the player registration for the Minor League Cricket exhibition league began. On August 15, 2020, USA Cricket announced the teams participating in the exhibition league matches, also listing the owners for each team. The draft for the exhibition league began on August 22, 2020, with the Chicago Catchers releasing their squad on September 12. Rizwan Cheema was later named as captain for the Blasters, with Karan Kumar down for vice-captaincy duties for the exhibition league.

2021 season 

After the conclusion of the exhibition league, USA Cricket announced that they were planning to launch the inaugural season of Minor League Cricket in spring 2021. Ahead of the official season, which was announced to kick off on July 31, the Catchers announced Rizwan Cheema as captain with Karan Kumar helming vice-captain duties. 

Throughout the group stage, the Catchers lost all of their matches, losing twice against the Athletics, the Blasters, the Hurricanes, the Stars, and the Americans, while losing once against the Strikers, the Blazers, and the Mustangs. The Catchers finished last in their group, thus not advancing to the quarterfinals.

2022 season 
For the 2022 season, it was announced that MiLC was replacing the Catchers with the Chicago Tigers.

Squad 
 Players with international caps are listed in bold.
  denotes a player who was unavailable for selection.
  denotes a player who was for rest of the season

Statistics

Most runs 

Source: CricClubs, Last updated: 9 January 2023

Most wickets 

Source: CricClubs, Last updated: 9 January 2023

See also 
 Major League Cricket
 Minor League Cricket
 2021 Minor League Cricket season
 2021 Minor League Cricket season final
 Minor League Cricket teams

References 

Minor League Cricket teams
Cricket teams in Chicago
Cricket clubs established in 2020
2020 establishments in Illinois
Sports clubs disestablished in 2022
2022 disestablishments in Illinois